Izaldo Braz Da Silva Junior (born 3 June 1993), known as Izaldo, is a Brazilian footballer who plays for Villa Nova, as a defender.

References

External links
 
 
 

1993 births
Living people
Brazilian footballers
Brazilian expatriate footballers
Clube Náutico Capibaribe players
Associação Desportiva Recreativa e Cultural Icasa players
Esporte Clube Novo Hamburgo players
Associação Desportiva Confiança players
FC Zimbru Chișinău players
FK Makedonija Gjorče Petrov players
Esporte Clube Jacuipense players
Anápolis Futebol Clube players
Salgueiro Atlético Clube players
União Recreativa dos Trabalhadores players
Villa Nova Atlético Clube players
Macedonian First Football League players
Moldovan Super Liga players
Campeonato Brasileiro Série B players
Campeonato Brasileiro Série C players
Campeonato Brasileiro Série D players
Place of birth missing (living people)
Association football defenders
Brazilian expatriate sportspeople in Moldova
Brazilian expatriate sportspeople in North Macedonia
Expatriate footballers in Moldova
Expatriate footballers in North Macedonia